An escape tunnel is a form of secret passage used as part of an escape from siege or captivity.  In medieval times such tunnels are usually constructed by the builders of castles or palaces who wish to have an escape route if their domain is under attack.  In the case of prisoners, escape tunnels are dug to be free of captivity.

In road and rail tunnels, narrower escape tunnels are provided to enable people to escape on foot in the event of a fire or other accident in the main tunnel. For example, between the two main bores of the Channel Tunnel is an access tunnel large enough to take a fire engine.

Medieval escape tunnels
Throughout the British Isles and much of northern Europe, escape tunnels were often part of the intrinsic design of fortified houses and palaces.  The tunnel would typically be one half to two kilometers long and open in a location not readily visible to attackers.  Examples of these tunnels are at Muchalls Castle (Scotland) and the Bishops Palace at Exeter (England).

Prison escapes

Successful escapes
The following escapes were at least a partial success, with prisoners escaping via tunnels:

Unsuccessful escapes
Prisoners at Camp Bucca, a U.S.-run prison in Iraq, completed their tunnelling but did not make their bid for freedom, with the tunnel being discovered in March 2005.

Fictional escapes
 Agamemnon Busmalis from the television series Oz
 The Count of Monte Cristo
 Hogan's Heroes
 The Shawshank Redemption
 Stalag 17
 Prison Break
 Homer Simpson, in a parody of Edmond Dantès, in the episode "Revenge Is a Dish Best Served Three Times"
 Prisoner Cell Block H, six inmates attempted to escape through a tunnel found in the prison grounds; when the tunnel collapsed, only two of the six got away. Three were trapped between the rubble and the blocked entrance and another was killed from the falling rubble. (Note: only four were meant to escape, but two followed to prevent them from going)

See also
Hunting Hitler
Smuggling tunnel

References

Tunnels
Escape